Absence of the Good is a 1999 American made-for-television thriller film starring Stephen Baldwin and directed by John Flynn.

References

External links

1999 television films
1999 films
1999 thriller films
1990s English-language films
American thriller television films
Films directed by John Flynn
1990s American films